Anabel Torres Restrepo (born 28 December 1948) is a Colombian poet and translator.

She studied Modern Languages at the University of Antioquia in Medellín and obtained a masters at the Institute of Social Studies in The Hague. She was assistant director at the National Library of Colombia (Biblioteca Nacional de Colombia).

Works 
 Casi poesía (1975)
 La mujer del esquimal (1981)
 Las bocas del amor (1982)
 Poemas (1987)
 Medias nonas (1992)
 Poemas de guerra (Barcelona, 2000)
 En un abrir y cerrar de hojas (Zaragoza, España, 2001)
 Agua herida (2004)
 El origen y destino de las especies de la fauna masculina paisa (2009)

Awards 
 Poetry National Awards, University of Nariño, 1974
 Poetry National Awards, University of Antioquia, 1980
 Roldanillo Poetry National Awards, Ediciones Embalaje, Museo Rayo, 1987

References 
  TORRES, Anabel. Medias Nonas. Editorial Universidad de Antioquia, Colección Celeste. 242 páginas, Medellín, 1992. 
  TORRES, Anabel. Agua herida. Ediciones Árbol de papel, Bogotá, 2004.

External links 
http://www.jornaldepoesia.jor.br/ag34torres.htm -
https://web.archive.org/web/20090801004637/http://www.festivaldepoesiademedellin.org/pub.php/es/Revista/ultimas_ediciones/62_63/torres.html –

1948 births
Living people
20th-century Colombian poets
Colombian translators
People from Bogotá
University of Antioquia alumni
Colombian women poets
20th-century women writers